Icterids or New World blackbirds make up a family, the Icteridae, of small to medium-sized, often colorful, New World passerine birds. Most species have black as a predominant plumage color, often enlivened by yellow, orange, or red. The species in the family vary widely in size, shape, behavior, and coloration. The name, meaning "jaundiced ones" (from the prominent yellow feathers of many species) comes from the Ancient Greek ikteros via the Latin ictericus. This group includes the New World blackbirds, New World orioles, the bobolink, meadowlarks, grackles, cowbirds, oropendolas, and caciques.

Despite the similar names, the first groups are only distantly related to the Old World common blackbird (a thrush) or the Old World orioles.

The Icteridae are not to be confused with the Icteriidae, a family created in 2017 and consisting of one species — the yellow-breasted chat (Icteria virens).

Characteristics
Most icterid species live in the tropics, although many species also occur in temperate regions, such as the red-winged blackbird and the long-tailed meadowlark. The highest densities of breeding species are found in Colombia and southern Mexico. They inhabit a range of habitats, including scrub, swamp, forest, and savanna. Temperate species are migratory, with many species that nest in the United States and Canada moving south into Mexico and Central America.

Icterids are variable in size, and often display considerable sexual dimorphism, with brighter coloration and greater size in males being typical. While such dimorphism is widely known in passerines, the sexual dimorphism by size is uniquely extreme in icterids. For example, the male great-tailed grackle is 60% heavier than the female. This variation is greater than in any other passerine family (unless the kinglet calyptura belongs with the cotingas, which would then have greater variation). One unusual morphological adaptation shared by the icterids is gaping, where the skull is configured to allow them to open their bills strongly rather than passively, allowing them to force open gaps to obtain otherwise hidden food.

Icterids have adapted to taking a wide range of foods. Oropendolas and caciques use their gaping motion to open the skins of fruit to obtain the soft insides, and have long bills adapted to the process. Others such as cowbirds and the bobolink have shorter, stubbier bills for crushing seeds. The Jamaican blackbird uses its bill to pry amongst tree bark and epiphytes, and has adopted the evolutionary niche filled elsewhere in the Neotropics by woodcreepers. Orioles drink nectar.

The nesting habits of these birds are also variable, including pendulous woven nests in the oropendolas and orioles. Many icterids are colonial, nesting in colonies of up to 100,000 birds. Some cowbird species engage in brood parasitism; females lay their eggs in the nests of other species, in a similar fashion to some cuckoos.

Some species of icterid have become agricultural pests; for example, red-winged blackbirds in the United States are considered the worst vertebrate pests on some crops, such as rice. The cost of controlling blackbirds in California was $30 per acre in 1994. Not all species have been as successful, and a number of species are threatened with extinction. These include insular forms such as the Jamaican blackbird, yellow-shouldered blackbird, and St Lucia oriole, all threatened by habitat loss; and the tricolored blackbird of California, which is threatened by habitat loss and destruction of nests.

Folklore
Cacique and oropendola species are called paucar or similar names in Peru. As paucares are considered very intelligent, Native Americans feed the brains to their children to make them fast learners. As the male plays no part in nesting and care of the young, a man who does not work may be called a "male paucar".

Systematics 
For more details, see List of icterid species.

FAMILY ICTERIDAE

Prehistoric icterid genera that have been described from Pleistocene fossil remains are Pandanaris from Rancho La Brea and Pyelorhamphus from Shelter Cave.

References 

  (1999): New World Blackbirds. Christopher Helm, London. 
  (2002): A robust phylogeny of the oropendolas: Polyphyly revealed by mitochondrial sequence data. Auk 119(2): 335–348. DOI: 10.1642/0004-8038(2002)119[0335:ARPOTO]2.0.CO;2 PDF fulltext
.  English version (not containing the word paucar) .

Further reading

External links

 New World Blackbirds (Icteridae) - videos, photos and sounds at the Internet Bird Collection
 Icteridae - Tree of Life Web Project

Taxa named by Nicholas Aylward Vigors